This is a list of notable persons by nationality.

By nationality
Delineating notable nationals of nation-states, and their significant dependent territories.

Afghans
Albanians
Algerians
Americans
Andorrans
Angolans
Antiguans and Barbudans
Argentines
Armenians
Arubans
Australians
Austrians
Azerbaijanis
Bahamians
Bahrainis
Bangladeshis
Barbadians
Basques
Belarusians
Belgians
Belizeans
Beninese
Bermudians
Bhutanese
Bolivians
Bosniaks
Bosnians and Herzegovinians
Botswana
Brazilians
Bretons
British
British Virgin Islanders
Bruneians
Bulgarians
Macedonian Bulgarians
Burkinabés
Burmese
Burundians
Cambodians
Cameroonians
Canadians
Catalans
Cape Verdeans
List of Caymanians
Chaldeans
Chadians
Chileans
Chinese
Colombians
Comorians
Congolese (DRC)
Congolese (RotC)
Costa Ricans
Croats
Cubans
Cypriots
Czechs
Danes
Greenlanders
Djiboutians
Dominicans (Commonwealth)
Dominicans (Republic)
Dutch
East Timorese
Ecuadorians
Egyptians
Emiratis
English
Equatoguineans
Eritreans
Estonians
Ethiopians
Falkland Islanders
Faroese
Fijians
Finns
Finnish Swedish
Filipinos
French citizens
Gabonese
Gambians
Georgians
Germans
Baltic Germans
Ghanaians
Gibraltarians
Greeks
Greek Macedonians
Grenadians
Guatemalans
Guianese (French)
Guineans
Guinea-Bissau nationals
Guyanese
Haitians
Hondurans
Hong Kongers
Hungarians
Icelanders
I-Kiribati
Indians
Indonesians
Iranians
Iraqis
Irish
Israelis
Italians
Ivoirians
Jamaicans
Japanese
Jordanians
Kazakhs
Kenyans
Koreans
Kosovars
Kuwaitis
Kyrgyzs
Lao
Latvians
Lebanese
Liberians
Libyans
Liechtensteiners
Lithuanians
Luxembourgers
Macao
Macedonians
Malagasy
Malawians
Malaysians
Maldivians
Malians
Maltese
Manx
Marshallese
Mauritanians
Mauritians
Mexicans
Micronesians
Moldovans
Monégasque
Mongolians
Montenegrins
Moroccans
Mozambicans
Namibians
Nauruans
Nepalese
New Zealanders
Nicaraguans
Nigeriens
Nigerians
Norwegians
Omani
Pakistanis
Palauans
Palestinians
Panamanians
Papua New Guineans
Paraguayans
Peruvians
Poles
Portuguese
Puerto Ricans
Qatari
Quebecers
Réunionnais
Romanians
Russians
Baltic Russians
Rwandans
Saint Kitts and Nevis
Saint Lucians
Salvadorans
Sammarinese
Samoans
São Tomé and Príncipe
Saudis
Scots
Senegalese
Serbs
Seychellois
Sierra Leoneans
Singaporeans
Slovaks
Slovenes
Solomon Islanders
Somalis
Somalilanders
Sotho
South Africans
Spaniards
Sri Lankans
Sudanese
Surinamese
Swazi
Swedes
Swiss
Syriacs
Syrians
Taiwanese
Tamils
Tajik
Tanzanians
Thais
Tibetans
Tobagonians
Togolese
Tongans
Trinidadians
Tunisians
Turks
Tuvaluans
Ugandans
Ukrainians
Uruguayans
Uzbeks
Vanuatuans
Venezuelans
Vietnamese
Vincentians
Welsh
Yemenis
Zambians
Zimbabweans

Excluding those ethnicities represented above, delineating notable according to their ethnic origin, e.g., Hispanics. For further information on appropriate categorisation, please refer to the discussion page.

Angamis
Aromanians
Assyrians
Basques
Bengalis
Berbers
Boers
Buryats
Cajuns
Catalans
Celts
Corsicans
Chuvash
Han Chinese
Hispanic and Latino Americans
Hutus
Igbo
Indigenous Australians
Indigenous people of the Americas
First Nations
Huaorani people
Inuit
Canadian Inuit
Greenlandic Inuit
Métis people
Native Americans
Malayali
Jews 
Kannadigas
Karen
Kodavas
Kurds
Macedonians
Malays
Moravians
Nagas
Punjabis
Roma
Samis
Silesians
Sindhis
Sinhalese
Syriacs
Tamils
Tatars
Telugus
Tulus
Tutsis

By location
Lists of notables by geographic birth location, not by ethnicity or national birth location.

Latin Americans
Born at sea

By language
Delineating notables according to their native language, e.g., Hebrew speakers, Anglophones.

Esperanto speakers
Hispanophones
English-speaking Quebecers

By occupation
 Lists of writers by ethnicity or nationality

Born within the nations included in organizations of nations
By African Union state

See also

 List of adjectival and demonymic forms of place names
 List of adjectival and demonymic forms for countries and nations
 List of sovereign states
 List of contemporary ethnic groups
 List of indigenous peoples